Happiness – Connie Francis On Broadway Today is a studio album recorded by U. S. Entertainer Connie Francis. The album features signature songs from the soundtracks of then current and/or recent Broadway musicals.

The album was recorded in March 1967 in New York.

Track listing

Side A

Side B

References

Connie Francis albums
1967 albums
MGM Records albums